12th & Imperial Transit Center is a San Diego Trolley station in Downtown San Diego, California. It is located in the East Village neighborhood of the city and serves the high-density residential developments that surround the stop. It is one of two stations from which Petco Park can be reached (the other being Gaslamp Quarter station). The station has historically been used as a major transfer point between the various Trolley lines and is the only station that is directly served by all four Trolley lines.


Service

San Diego Trolley 
The Blue Line and the Orange Line are served by the station's island platforms, and the two lines split just south of this station to serve South Bay and East County, respectively. To the north, both lines run parallel to each other through downtown on Park Boulevard and turn west at City College to run along C Street towards America Plaza and the Courthouse Station, respectively.

The Bayside Terminal platform of the 12th & Imperial station marks the western terminus of the Green Line, which upon departing from 12th & Imperial goes through the Gaslamp Quarter, Convention Center and Seaport Village stations to the Santa Fe Depot, and then on to the Old Town Transit Center and its destination at Santee.

The Silver Line uses the platform directly adjacent to the 1255 Imperial Avenue building as the start of its clockwise circular route around Downtown San Diego.

This station was renovated in two stages  as part of the Trolley Renewal Project: in summer 2011 for the Bayside Terminal platform, and from late October 2012 until June 2013 for the main station platforms.

Prior to September 2, 2012, Orange Line trolleys used to loop around Downtown San Diego to terminate at the Bayside Terminal platform of this station until a system redesign rerouted the western terminus of the line to Santa Fe Depot and extended the Green Line's terminus from Old Town Transit Center to the Bayside Terminal.

Platforms

Transfer platforms

Bayside terminal platform

Bus service 
San Diego MTS bus routes 4, 12, 901, and 929 stop at the 12th & Imperial Transit Station. The bus stops are to the east of the northbound Blue Line/Orange Line Trolley platform, on the west side of National Avenue.

The San Diego station used by Greyhound Bus Lines is currently located adjacent to the southeast corner of the station, at 1313 National Avenue.

Location 
The 12th & Imperial Transit Center is built into the James R. Mills Building, a 10-story office tower that houses the headquarters of the San Diego Metropolitan Transit System. It is also located approximately two blocks east of Petco Park, just south of the San Diego Central Library that opened in 2013.

This station is directly adjacent to the San Diego Trolley maintenance yard,  thus, it is usually where the trolleys from the yard start their trips for the day.

See also 
 List of San Diego Trolley stations

References 

Blue Line (San Diego Trolley)
Green Line (San Diego Trolley)
Orange Line (San Diego Trolley)
Silver Line (San Diego Trolley)
Railway stations in the United States opened in 1981
San Diego Trolley stations in San Diego
1981 establishments in California